The green honeycreeper (Chlorophanes spiza) is a small bird in the tanager family. It is found in the tropical New World from southern Mexico south to Brazil, and on Trinidad. It is the only member of the genus  Chlorophanes.

Taxonomy
The green honeycreeper was formally described in 1758 by the Swedish naturalist Carl Linnaeus in the tenth edition of his Systema Naturae under its current binomial name Motacilla spiza. He specified the type locality as Suriname. The specific epithet is the Ancient Greek word for a common finch.  Linnaeus based his description on the "green black-cap fly-catcher" that the English naturalist George Edwards had described and illustrated in his 1743 book A Natural History of Uncommon Birds. In 1853 the German naturalist Ludwig Reichenbach erected the genus Chlorophanes to accommodate the green honeycreeper. The name combines the Ancient Greek khlōros meaning green with -phanēs meaning showing. A comprehensive molecular phylogenetic study of the tanager family Thraupidae published in 2014 found that the green honeycreeper and the golden-collared honeycreeper (Iridophanes pulcherrimus) were sister species.

Seven subspecies are recognised:
 C. s. guatemalensis Sclater, PL, 1861 – south Mexico to Honduras
 C. s. argutus Bangs & Barbour, 1922 – east Honduras to northwest Colombia
 C. s. exsul Berlepsch & Taczanowski, 1884 – southwest Colombia and west Ecuador
 C. s. subtropicalis Todd, 1924 – north, central Colombia and west Venezuela
 C. s. spiza (Linnaeus, 1758) – Trinidad, east Colombia, Venezuela (except far west), the Guianas and north Brazil
 C. s. caerulescens Cassin, 1865 – south-central Colombia through east Ecuador and east Peru to central Bolivia and west Brazil
 C. s. axillaris Zimmer, JT, 1929 – east, southeast Brazil

The purplish honeycreeper (Chlorophanes purpurascens), a bird from Venezuela known only from the type specimen, is now thought to be an intergeneric hybrid between the green honeycreeper and either the red-legged honeycreeper or the blue dacnis.

Description
It has a long decurved bill. The male is mainly blue-tinged green with a black head and a mostly bright yellow bill. The female green honeycreeper is grass-green, paler on the throat, and lacks the male's iridescence and black head. Immatures are plumaged similar to females. The call is a sharp chip.

Behavior
This is a forest canopy species. The female green honeycreeper builds a small cup nest in a tree, and incubates the clutch of two brown-blotched white eggs for 13 days. It is less heavily dependent on nectar than the other honeycreepers, fruit and seeds being its main food (60%), with nectar (20%) and insects  (15%) as less important components of its diet.

References

Further reading

External links

 Xeno-canto: audio recordings of the green honeycreeper

green honeycreeper
Birds of Central America
Birds of the Tumbes-Chocó-Magdalena
Birds of Trinidad and Tobago
Birds of the Amazon Basin
Birds of the Atlantic Forest
green honeycreeper
green honeycreeper
Birds of Brazil